Mario Berriatúa (1925–1970) was a Spanish film actor.

Selected filmography
 Mariona Rebull (1947)
 Guest of Darkness (1948)
 Neutrality (1949)
 Don Juan (1950)
 Tales of the Alhambra (1950)
 The Troublemaker (1950)
 Reckless (1951)
 Day by Day (1951)
 Our Lady of Fatima (1951)
 The Call of Africa (1952)
 The Song of Sister Maria (1952)
 The Floor Burns (1952)
 A Passenger Disappeared (1953)
 Day by Day (1954)
 High Fashion (1954)
 The Mayor of Zalamea (1954)
 Juan Simón's Daughter (1957)
 Listen To My Song (1959)
 Sonatas (1959)
 Peace Never Comes (1960)

References

Bibliography
 Gary Allen Smith. Epic Films: Casts, Credits and Commentary on More Than 350 Historical Spectacle Movies. McFarland, 2004.

External links

Male actors from Madrid
1925 births
1970 deaths
Spanish male film actors